Euan G. Mason (born c.1953) is Professor at the School of Forestry at the University of Canterbury in Christchurch, New Zealand.

Biography 
Mason was born in Invercargill, New Zealand but raised in Lower Hutt and Geneva before moving on to New Jersey. His hobbies include astronomy, music, computer programming and football.

His main research areas include silviculture, growth and yield modelling, hybrid modelling and decision-support (applied artificial intelligence). He is skilled in the field of dendrology, the identification of tree species. He was editor of the New Zealand Journal of Forestry from 2006.

Selected works
 
 
 Mason, E.G. 2000. 'Evaluation of a model of beech forest growing on the West Coast of the South Island of New Zealand'. New Zealand Journal of Forestry, 44 (4): 26–31.
 Mason, E.G. 2001. 'A model of the juvenile growth and survival of Pinus radiata D. Don: Adding the effects of initial seedling diameter and plant handling'. New Forests, 22: 133–158
 Lassere, J., Mason, E.G, & Watt, M.S. 2004. 'The influence of initial stocking on corewood stiffness in a clonal experiment of 11-year-old Pinus radiata D.Don'. New Zealand Journal of Forestry, 44 (3), 18–23.
 
 
 
 
 
 
 
 
 
 Waghorn, M.J., Mason, E.G., & Watt, M.S. 2007. 'Assessing interactions between initial stand stocking and genotype on growth and form of 17-year-old Pinus radiata in Canterbury, New Zealand Journal of Forestry, 52 (1).

References 

Forestry academics
Living people
Academic staff of the University of Canterbury
People from Invercargill
New Zealand foresters
Dendrologists
Academic journal editors
Year of birth missing (living people)